The Anglesea Power Station was a brown coalpowered thermal power station located at Anglesea, in Victoria, Australia. It was operated by Alcoa of Australia and supplied almost 40% of the electricity used by the company's Point Henry aluminium smelter, until the smelter's closure in August 2014.

The power station was brought online on 20 March 1969, and was supplied with brown coal from the adjacent open cut mine, transported to the power station along a -long private road. Overburden was stripped and backfilled into the mined area by earthmoving contractors, using conventional power shovels and trucks. About 80 people worked at the mine and power station.

In June 2015, Alcoa announced that the power plant and mine would close at the end of August 2015, after the company was unable to find a buyer for the power station. On 31 August 2015, the plant ceased operation as planned. Mine rehabilitation, and plant decommissioning and demolition, have been carried out.

History
In about 1955, test bores for coal were made at Anglesea by Roche Brothers, who were then operating a coal mine at nearby Wensleydale, where the reserves were dwindling. An extensive coal deposit was found two kilometres to the north of the Anglesea township, and mining commenced in 1959 to supply brown coal to industry and institutions in the Geelong area.

The mining rights were taken over by Western Mining Corporation (WMC) in 1961 to supply the power station planned by Alcoa of Australia.

Following negotiation with the Victorian government in 2011, Alcoa took up a 50-year extension of the Agreement under the Mines (Aluminium Agreement) Act 1961, allowing for continued operation of the mine and power station until 2016.

The coal at Anglesea has a high quality heat value when compared to other brown coals used to produce electricity in Victoria, but has a much higher level of sulphur, at around 3%, resulting in high levels of sulfur dioxide (SO2) being emitted. Carbon Monitoring for Action estimated that the power station emitted  of greenhouse gases each year as a result of burning the coal. The Anglesea power station drew its cooling water from six sub-artesian well bores, supplemented with rainwater.

With the closure of the Point Henry Aluminium smelter, Alcoa applied for and was granted a licence in May 2014 by the Victorian Essential Services Commission to sell electricity to the national electricity market. In February 2014, an Alcoa spokesperson said that it was seeking sale options for the power station, which might be closed if a sale was not possible. In May 2015, Alcoa announced that it was unable to find a buyer for the plant, and would close it and the associated coal mine in August 2015. Closure occurred as planned on 31 August 2015.

Criticism
Since 2011, Alcoa and the Anglesea power station had come under increasing local criticism, with residents forming the Surf Coast Air Action group concerned with health impacts of air pollution from the mine and power station. The group campaigned for reduced emissions from the power station and, following the closure of the Point Henry aluminium smelter, claimed that there was little justification for continuing the operation of the power station.

In a December 2013 submission to the Essential Services Commission, Friends of the Earth Australia argued that Alcoa should not be granted a licence to directly sell power to the National Electricity Market for four reasons: no additional coal-fired power was needed, Alcoa has no social licence to operate in the energy market, local health concerns, and that continuing operation of the power station undermined efforts to tackle climate change.

Alcoa's licence to supply electricity to the grid was approved, although community groups said the decision lacked transparency and legitimacy, because no community consultation had been conducted by the Essential Services Commission.

Protests
Two major protests in Anglesea occurred in 2014 regarding the future of the coal mine and power station. In July, over 500 people made up a human sign on the Anglesea beach saying "Shut it Down". On 10 August 2014, several hundred people attended a rally and march calling for the coal mine and power station to be closed.

See also

 List of power stations in Victoria
 State Electricity Commission of Victoria

References

External links 
 Alcoa of Australia: Anglesea Power Station

Coal-fired power stations in Victoria (Australia)
Energy infrastructure completed in 1969
Former power stations in Australia